John Palavi is a New Zealand professional rugby league footballer who plays for the Tweed Heads Seagulls in the Queensland Cup.

He previously played for the New Zealand Warriors in the NRL and the Limoux Grizzlies in the Elite One Championship.

Background
Palavi is of Tongan descent, attended St Paul's College and played for the Richmond Rovers and Point Chevalier Pirates.

Playing career
He was then signed by the New Zealand Warriors and played in the National Youth Competition between 2010 and 2012. In 2011 he was part of the Junior Warriors side who won the grand final. That year he was named the club's NYC Player of the Year and also was named in the Junior Kiwis side.

In 2013 he played for the Auckland Vulcans in the New South Wales Cup and was named the Vulcan's Rookie of the Year.

He made the Warriors first grade squad in 2014 and was named to make his National Rugby League debut in round one.

In 2015 he became captain for the New Zealand Warriors New South Wales Cup side. On 27 September, he was named on the interchange bench in the 2015 New South Wales Cup Team of the Year.

He was released by the Warriors at the end of the 2016 season and joined the Limoux Grizzlies in the Elite One Championship.

Palavi signed with the Tweed Heads Seagulls for the 2019 season, and is on a train and trial contract with the Gold Coast Titans.

References

External links

Zero Tackle profile

1992 births
Living people
Auckland rugby league team players
Junior Kiwis players
New Zealand rugby league players
New Zealand sportspeople of Tongan descent
New Zealand Warriors players
Limoux Grizzlies players
People educated at St Paul's College, Auckland
Point Chevalier Pirates players
Richmond Bulldogs players
Rugby league players from Auckland
Rugby league props
Rugby league second-rows